Yangon Region(formerly Rangoon Division and Yangon Division) is an administrative region of Myanmar. Located in central Myanmar, the division is bordered by Bago Region to the north and east, the Gulf of Martaban to the south, and Ayeyarwady Region to the west. Yangon Region is dominated by its capital city of Yangon, the former national capital and the largest city in the country. Other important cities are Thanlyin and Twante. The division is the most developed region of the country and the main international gateway. The division measures  .

History

The region was historically populated by the Mon. Politically, the area was controlled by Mon kingdoms prior to 1057, and after 1057, with few exceptions, by Burman kingdoms from the north. The control of the region reverted to Pegu-based Mon kingdoms in the 13th to 16th centuries (1287–1539) and briefly in the 18th century (1740–57). The Portuguese were in control of Thanlyin (Syriam) and the surrounding area from 1599 to 1613.

For centuries, Thanlyin was the most important port city in Lower Myanmar until the mid-18th century when King Alaungpaya chose to enlarge a small village across the river near the great Shwedagon Pagoda named Dagon.

The British first captured Yangon in the First Anglo-Burmese War (1824–26) but returned it Burmese administration after the war. The British seized Yangon and all of Lower Burma in the Second Anglo-Burmese War of 1852, and subsequently transformed Yangon into the commercial and political hub of British Burma. Yangon was the capital of British Burma and Hanthawaddy Province, which covered today's Yangon and Bago divisions. The British brought in many Indians to serve as workers and civil servants. By the 1930s, the Indians made up half of Yangon city, and only one-third was  Burmese.

Between World War I and World War II, Yangon was the center of Burmese nationalist movement. Many future Burmese political figures such as Aung San, U Nu, U Thant and Ne Win were all one-time Rangoon University students. Yangon Region was under Japanese occupation between April 1942 and May 1945.

After Myanmar gained independence from the United Kingdom in January 1948, the Hanthawaddy Province was renamed Pegu (Bago) Division, with Yangon as its capital. In 1964, Rangoon Division was split from Pegu Division. The capital of Pegu Division was changed from Rangoon to Pegu. In June 1974, Hanthawaddy (Hongsavatoi) and Hmawbi townships were transferred from Pegu Division to Rangoon Division.

Post-war Yangon grew tremendously. Successive Burmese governments built satellite towns near Yangon. Today, Yangon Region is essentially the Greater Yangon metropolitan area surrounded by a hollow rural hinterland.

Administrative divisions
There were only four districts in Yangon Region. On 30 April 2022, these districts were expanded to 14 districts by the provisional government . Of the 45, the city of Yangon now encompasses 33 townships.

Government

Executive
Yangon Region Government

Legislative
Yangon Region Hluttaw

Judiciary
Yangon Region High Court

Demographics

The ethnic Burmese makes up the majority of the population. The division is also home to a large number of South Asians (mainly Indians) and Burmese Chinese. According to 2014 census report, the population of Yangon region is 7.36 million. Burmese is the primary language used by Burmese of all ethnic backgrounds. English is the main second language among the urban elite of Yangon.

Religion
According to the 2014 Myanmar Census, Buddhists make up 91% of Yangon Region’s population, forming the largest religious community there. Minority religious communities include Christians (3.2%), Muslims (4.7%), and Hindus (1%) who collectively comprise the remainder of Yangon Region’s population. 0.1% of the population listed no religion, other religions, or were otherwise not enumerated.

According to the State Sangha Maha Nayaka Committee’s 2016 statistics, 88,442 Buddhist monks were registered in Yangon Region, comprising 16.5% of Myanmar's total Sangha membership, which includes both novice samanera and fully-ordained bhikkhu. The majority of monks belong to the Thudhamma Nikaya (81.2%), followed by Shwegyin Nikaya (13.6%), with the remainder of monks belonging to other small monastic orders. 16,960 thilashin were registered in Yangon Region, comprising 28.1% of Myanmar’s total thilashin community, the largest in Myanmar.

Economy

Yangon Region is the most developed region in the country. According to the government's official statistics for FY 2010–2011, the size of the economy of Yangon Region was 8.93 trillion kyat, or 23% of the national GDP. Greater Yangon is Lower Myanmar’s main trading hub for all kinds of merchandise – from basic food stuffs to used cars. Bayinnaung Market is the largest wholesale center in the country for rice, beans and pulses, and other agricultural commodities. Much of the country’s legal imports and exports go through Thanlyin's Thilawa port, the largest and busiest port in Myanmar. At least 14 light industrial zones ring Yangon, employing thousands of workers. Outside Greater Yangon, rice farming remains predominant. Other important crops include jute, pulses, rubber, sugarcane, and groundnut.

Transport

Yangon Region has the best transportation infrastructure in the country. All transport to and from the rest of the country (and the world) goes through Yangon. Five "highways" link Yangon to the rest of the country. (To be sure, the definition of highway is loosely used. Most highways are no more than two lane roads.) Yangon International Airport is the main international gateway of the country. Yangon Central Railway Station is a major hub of the  Myanmar Railways system. Twante Canal, which links Yangon to Ayeyarwaddy Region, is also widely used for both transport and commerce.

As motor transportation is highly expensive for most people, buses are the main mode of transportation within the division or regions nearby. In January 2008, Yangon Region had nearly 182,000 motor vehicles, 17.7% of the country's total.

Education

Although the city of Yangon has the best education facilities in the country, the educational facilities and opportunities available in the rest of Yangon Region are extremely poor. Many students in rural and poor districts do not finish middle school. According to official statistics, only about 23% of primary school students make it to high school. Most students are enrolled in the public school system. Private schools, which cost at least $8,000 a year in tuition per student, are strictly the preserve of the elite.

Nearly all of the division's universities are in Greater Yangon. Dagon University in North Dagon and the University of East Yangon in Thanlyin are among the largest undergraduate universities in the country. Yangon's University of Medicine 1, Yangon, University of Medicine 2, Yangon, Yangon Technological University, University of Computer Studies, Yangon and Thanlyin's Myanmar Maritime University are among the most selective universities in Myanmar.

The University of West Yangon in Htantabin and the Officers Training School in Hmawbi are two major institutions of higher education outside Greater Yangon.

Health care

The general state of health care in Myanmar is poor. The military government spends anywhere from 0.5% to 3% of the country's GDP on health care, consistently ranking among the lowest in the world. Although health care is nominally free, in reality, patients have to pay for medicine and treatment, even in public clinics and hospitals. Public hospitals lack many of the basic facilities and equipment. Still, Yangon Region has the best medical facilities and personnel available in the country. The following is a summary of the public health system in the division, in the fiscal year 2002-2003.

References

External links
 Taipei American Chamber of Commerce; Topics Magazine, Analysis, November 2012.  Myanmar: Southeast Asia's Last Frontier for Investment, BY DAVID DUBYNE

 
Regions of Myanmar